The Richmond County School System is an American public school system based in Augusta, Georgia. It is run by the Richmond County Board of Education which, under Article VIII, § V, Paragraph 2, requires that each school system be under the management and control of an elected board of education. As elected Constitutional officials of Georgia, the school board members are responsible for setting educational policies, employing school personnel, providing buildings and equipment, operating a transportation system, and disbursing school funds. The board of education meets in the Richmond County Board of Education building at 864 Broad Street in Augusta, Georgia. It serves consolidated Augusta-Richmond County, Georgia and the south Richmond County cities of Hephzibah and Blythe. The system has an enrollment of around 32,000 students, attending 36 elementary schools, ten middle schools, eight high schools, four magnet schools, and three other schools. The school board  
has its own police department which provides law enforcement services to all the district's schools.

The Richmond County School System is in the third phase of a construction program that will renovate older schools and add new schools, particularly for its magnet program. This will include a fine arts elementary magnet school, a vocational magnet school, and second magnet traditional elementary school.

On the most recent state-mandated testing of the academic achievement as well as college- and career-readiness of its students (2019 Georgia Milestones Assessment System-GMAS), the Richmond County School System was ranked among the bottom-ten of the 180 public school systems  in Georgia.

Schools

Elementary schools
A. Brian Merry Elementary School
Barton Chapel Elementary School
Bayvale Elementary School
Belair K-8 School
Blythe Elementary School
Copeland Elementary School
Deer Chase Elementary School
Diamond Lakes Elementary School
Freedom Park Elementary School
Garrett Elementary School
Glenn Hills Elementary School
Goshen Elementary School
Gracewood Elementary School
Hains Elementary School
Hephzibah Elementary School
Hornsby K-8 School
Jamestown Elementary School
Jenkins-White Elementary School
Lake Forest Hills Elementary School
Lamar-Millege Elementary School
McBean Elementary School
Meadowbrook Elementary School
Monte Sano Elementary School
Richmond Hill K-8
Sue Reynolds Elementary School
Terrace Manor Elementary School
Tobacco Road Elementary School
Warren Road Elementary School
Wheeless Road Elementary School
Wilkinson Gardens Elementary School
Willis Foreman Elementary School

Middle schools

 Belair K-8 School
 Freedom Park K-8 School

Glenn Hills Middle School
Hephzibah Middle School
Hornsby Middle School
Langford Middle School
Murphey Middle School
Pine Hill Middle School
Richmond Hill K-8 School
Spirit Creek Middle School
Tutt Middle School

High schools
Academy of Richmond County
Cross Creek High School
George P. Butler High School
Glenn Hills High School
Hephzibah High School
Lucy Craft Laney High School
T. W. Josey High School
Westside High School

Magnet schools
A. R. Johnson Health Science and Engineering Magnet High School
C. T. Walker Traditional Magnet School
John S. Davidson Fine Arts Magnet School
Richmond County Technical Career Magnet School

Other schools
Alternative School at Morgan Road
Sand Hills Program
Cyber Academy of Excellence
eSchool
Marion E. Barnes Career Center
Reaching Maximum Potential through Manufacturing
Performance Learning Center

See also

 Georgia Department of Education
 Cumming v. Richmond County Board of Education (1899)

References

External links
 Richmond County Schools

School districts in Georgia (U.S. state)
Education in Richmond County, Georgia
Education in Augusta, Georgia